Latif Gjondeda (born 28 December 1960) is an Albanian retired football defender.

Club career
Gjondeda spent his entire career with Flamurtari in the 1980s and 1990s, during the club's golden years alongside fellow international players like Eqerem Memushi, Kreshnik Çipi, Rrapo Taho, Roland Iljadhi and Agim Bubeqi.

International career
He made his debut for Albania in an October 1987 European Championship qualification match against Romania and earned a total of 5 caps, scoring no goals. His final international was a January 1992 friendly match against Greece.

Later years
Gjondeda was assistant to manager Eqerem Memushi when Flamurtari won the 2009 Albanian Cup.
After he was a teacher at “rilindja” school in Vlore

Honours
Albanian Superliga: 1
 1991

Albanian Cup: 2
 1985, 1988

References

External links

1960 births
Living people
Association football defenders
Albanian footballers
Albania international footballers
Flamurtari Vlorë players
Albanian football managers
Flamurtari Vlorë managers
Kategoria Superiore players
Kategoria Superiore managers